Pine Mountain Valley is located in Harris County, Georgia, United States. Its ZIP code is 31823.

Geography

Pine Mountain Valley is located at 32° 47′ 55″ N, 84° 49′ 24″ W (32.798611 N, -84.823333 W). The community is located at the intersection of Georgia State Routes 116 and 354. GA-116 runs from west to east through the community, leading east  to Shiloh and southwest  to Hamilton, the Harris County seat. GA-354 runs northwest  to the city of Pine Mountain. The community is located in the Piedmont region of the state just to the south of the Pine Mountain Range.

References

External links
 Pine Mountain Valley Resettlement Project historical marker
 Valley of Hope historical marker

Unincorporated communities in Harris County, Georgia
Unincorporated communities in Georgia (U.S. state)